The Building at 317 S. 3rd St. in Grand Forks, North Dakota was built circa 1884 in a style that has been described as Early Commercial and Vernacular.

Among other uses it lodged overflow patrons of the next door Richardson House.

The building was listed on the National Register of Historic Places in 1982. It was destroyed by the 1997 Grand Forks Flood, and was officially delisted in 2018.

References

Commercial buildings on the National Register of Historic Places in North Dakota
Vernacular architecture in North Dakota
Commercial buildings completed in 1884
Demolished buildings and structures in North Dakota
National Register of Historic Places in Grand Forks, North Dakota
1884 establishments in Dakota Territory